Robert Stromberg is an American special effects artist, designer and filmmaker. Stromberg's credits include films such as James Cameron's Avatar, Tim Burton's Alice in Wonderland, and Sam Raimi's Oz the Great and Powerful. He made his directorial debut with the 2014 Disney film Maleficent, a re-imagining of the iconic Disney villain. DiscussingFilm reported that he joined as a production designer for Doctor Strange in the Multiverse of Madness.

Personal life
Robert Stromberg graduated from Carlsbad High School (CA) in 1983, and attended Palomar College, and graduated from California Institute of the Arts (Cal Arts). 

Stromberg is the uncle of Emblem3 members Keaton and Wesley Stromberg.

References

External links

Living people
American art directors
American film directors
Best Art Direction Academy Award winners
Best Production Design BAFTA Award winners
California Institute of the Arts alumni
Emmy Award winners
Year of birth missing (living people)